Gianluca Bortolami (born 28 August 1968) is an Italian former professional road racing cyclist. Bortolami's greatest feats was capturing the monumental classic Tour of Flanders in 2001 and winning the 1994 UCI Road World Cup season championship. He is the namesake of Bortolami's Pizzeria in Vancouver, Washington.

Bortolami was born in Locate di Triulzi, province of Milan. He competed in the road race at the 1988 Summer Olympics. He turned professional in 1990 and rode for Lampre. He finished 75th in the 2002 Tour de France, 46th in the 1997 Tour, 13th in the 1994 Tour with one stage win, and 73rd in the 1993 Tour. He was tested positive for cortisone in 2003 during Three Days of De Panne.  He was suspended for six months by the Italian cycling federation.

Major results 

1990
 1st Stage 5 Tour of Britain
1991
 1st Stage 4a Tour of Britain
1992
 Volta a Portugal
1st Stages 10 & 11
 1st Stage 2 Tour de Romandie
1993
 1st Cronostaffeta
 6th Milano–Torino
1994
 1st  UCI Road World Cup
 1st Giro del Veneto
 1st Gran Premio Città di Camaiore
 1st Leeds International Classic
 1st Züri-Metzgete
 1st Stage 7 Tour de France
 2nd Paris–Tours
 2nd Grand Prix de Fourmies
 2nd Trofeo Matteotti
 5th E3 Prijs Vlaanderen
 7th Brabantse Pijl
1995
 1st Prologue Tour DuPont
 3rd Overall Three Days of De Panne
 3rd Overall Tour de Luxembourg
 5th Tour of Flanders
 9th Amstel Gold Race
 10th Paris–Roubaix
1996
 2nd Paris–Roubaix
 2nd Nice–Alassio
 8th Amstel Gold Race
1997
 1st Coppa Bernocchi
 1st Giro del Piemonte
 1st Trofeo dello Scalatore
 2nd Overall Volta a Galega
1st Stage 5
 2nd Grand Prix de Fourmies
 3rd Rochester International Classic
 4th Overall Route du Sud
 5th Giro dell'Emilia
1998
 1st Gran Premio di Chiasso
 2nd Omloop Het Volk
 2nd Prueba Villafranca de Ordizia
 4th Trofeo Laigueglia
 9th Paris–Roubaix
 9th Tour of Flanders
1999
 Tour of Austria
1st Stages 1 & 2
2000
 3rd Giro di Toscana
2001
 1st Tour of Flanders
 1st Sparkassen Giro Bochum
 1st Stage 2 Tour de Suisse
 1st Stage 3 Brixia Tour
 3rd Tre Valli Varesine
 5th Tour du Haut Var
 6th Coppa Bernocchi
 8th Trofeo Laigueglia
2002
 1st Giro della Romagna
 1st Grand Prix de Fourmies
 1st Gran Premio Bruno Beghelli
 1st Milano–Vignola
 2nd Coppa Placci
 2nd Coppa Bernocchi
 3rd Giro del Piemonte
 5th Gran Premio Fred Mengoni
 7th Giro del Veneto
 9th Overall Tour of Qatar
 9th Trofeo Melinda
2003
 2nd Overall Three Days of De Panne
1st Stage 1
2004
 1st Giro della Romagna
 6th Gran Premio Bruno Beghelli
 7th Overall Tour of Belgium
1st Stage 1

Grand Tour general classification results timeline

References

External links 

Profile by world-of-cycling.com

1968 births
Living people
Cyclists from the Metropolitan City of Milan
Italian male cyclists
Italian Tour de France stage winners
Tour de Suisse stage winners
Olympic cyclists of Italy
Cyclists at the 1988 Summer Olympics
UCI Road World Cup winners